Elections to Three Rivers Council were held on 4 May 2006. One third of the council was up for election and the Liberal Democrat party stayed in overall control of the council.

After the election, the composition of the council was:
Liberal Democrat 30
Conservative 11
Labour 7

Election result

Ward results

References
2006 Three Rivers election result
Ward results

2006
2006 English local elections
2000s in Hertfordshire